The royal ghost frog (Heleophryne regis), also known as the southern ghost frog or Cape ghost frog, is a species of frog in the family Heleophrynidae. It is endemic to South Africa, and lives in fast-moving streams.

Description
Ghost frogs get their name as one of the six species found in Skeleton Gorge (on Table Mountain), South Africa. The underside of the body, including the jaw, has small hooks, which help the frogs climb over wet rocks near their habitats. The frogs measure  in length. It is in the same size range as Hewitt's ghost frog, but is smaller than Purcell's ghost frog. The top side of its body is brown with yellow spots, and the underside is white. The limbs are plain-colored, and flesh-colored underneath. Their tadpoles take up to two years to develop fully. The call of the royal ghost frog is a harsh, creaking sound, given at around one call per second.

Habitat
All species of ghost frogs are endemic to the southern tip of Africa. Its natural habitat is fynbos heathland in the Western and Eastern provinces of South Africa, and specifically cool mountain streams at an altitude of 230–790 meters.

It is threatened by habitat loss, as it requires clean, fast-moving water in which to live. Threats to its habitat include siltation of the freshwater streams.

References

Heleophryne
Frogs of Africa
Endemic amphibians of South Africa
Taxa named by John Hewitt (herpetologist)
Amphibians described in 1910
Taxonomy articles created by Polbot